The Journal of Greco-Roman Christianity and Judaism is a peer-reviewed academic journal published by McMaster Divinity College. The editor-in-chief is Stanley E. Porter (McMaster Divinity College). Articles are published open access, until a volume is finished, after which they are available only in print. The journal is abstracted and indexed in the ATLA Religion Database.

References

External links 
 

Journals about ancient Christianity
Judaic studies journals
Publications established in 2000
Annual journals
English-language journals